Boris Rösner (25 January 1951 in Opava – 31 May 2006 in Kladno) was a Czech actor. He starred in the film Poslední propadne peklu under director Ludvík Ráža in 1982.

References

External links
 

1951 births
2006 deaths
Czech male film actors
Czech male television actors
Czech male stage actors
People from Opava
Recipients of Medal of Merit (Czech Republic)
Academy of Performing Arts in Prague alumni
Deaths from cancer in the Czech Republic
Recipients of the Thalia Award